The following highways are numbered 86A:

United States
 Nebraska Highway 86A (former)
 Nebraska Spur 86A
 New York State Route 86A (former)

See also
List of highways numbered 86